Blowing My Mind is the first album by the Barry Goldberg Blues Band. It was released in 1966 (see 1966 in music).

Track listing
 "Gettin' It Down" (Barry Goldberg)
 "Mean Old World" (Goldberg)
 "Twice a Man" (Goldberg)
 "Whole Lotta Shakin' Going On" (Dave Williams, Sunny David)
 "Big Boss Man" (Al Smith, Luther Dixon)
 "Blowing My Mind" (Goldberg, Roy Ruby)
 "That'll Be the Day" (Buddy Holly, Jerry Allison, Norman Petty)
 "Can't Stand to See You Go" (Jimmy Reed)
 "Put Me Down" (Goldberg, Roy Ruby)
 "Think" (Deadric Malone, Jimmy McCracklin)

Bonus track, 1998 CD reissue
11. "Ginger Man" (Geoff Muldaur)

Personnel
The Barry Goldberg Blues Band
Barry Goldberg – vocals, organ
Charlie Musselwhite – harmonica
Harvey Mandel – lead guitar
Roy Ruby – bass guitar
Maurice McKinley – drums
with:
Duane Allman - slide guitar on "Twice a Man"

References

1966 debut albums
Albums produced by Billy Sherrill
Epic Records albums